Merajuddin Khan  is a political leader in Pakistan. He is originally from Jehangira, Nawshehra district, NWFP.

He played an active role in student politics in the late 1980s . He also elected all Pakistan president of Islami Jamiat-e-Talaba in 19?? and 19??. He holds an MA (??) and from the University of Peshawar.

Today, Mr Merajuddin Khan is a leader of Jamaat-e-Islami Nawshehra, Pakistan's Islamic religio-political party.

References 

Living people
Year of birth missing (living people)